Opisthopatus amatolensis is a species of velvet worm in the Peripatopsidae family. This species has 16 pairs of legs. The type locality is in South Africa. The validity of this species is uncertain: Although some authorities deem O. amatolensis to be invalid even as a subspecies of O. cinctipes, a similar species also found in South Africa, other authorities recognize O. amatolensis as a separate species, citing the significant distance (161 km) between the type localities of these two species.

References

Endemic fauna of South Africa
Onychophorans of temperate Africa
Onychophoran species
Animals described in 1947